Vairichettipalayam is a small panchayat town in Thuraiyur taluk in Tiruchirappalli district, Tamil Nadu, India. In 2011 its population was 7113.

References

Cities and towns in Tamil Nadu